Ammaji Ki Galli is an Indian sitcom which aired on SAB TV from 20 June 2011 to 23 September 2011. The show is written by Divy Nidhi Sharma and Aparajita Sharma and produced by Contiloe Entertainment.

Plot
The show revolves around the lives of people living in a jam-packed street in Amritsar. Ammaji is the main protagonist and also the narrator of the show. She is well-informed and the oldest member of the galli (Street, in English). Ammaji is respected by all the people of the street.

The street is filled with different characters who have their own style of mannerism and personality. There is Kalavati, who uses an ornate language which only her daughter-in-law understands. Sheetal daughter-in-law of Kalawati, her husband has gone to Canada to earn money; her punchline being "Har Chees Mein Good Hota Hai Ji" (There is good in everything). Then there is Roshni, who married Surinder Sharma against her parents wishes, has a complete day care centre of flowers which she fondly takes care like her children.

Priyanka, the twenty something girl whose mother passed when she was a child and here father is mostly out of India for work purposes. She is immediate neighbor of Parminder, who takes care of Priyanka as a responsible neighbor and is like an elder sister to her. One more thing about her is that she is extremely fond of eating Samosas, her weak-point. Between all the problems the people face, Ammaji silently solves all the problems without getting noticed.

Cast
Farida Jalal as Ammaji
Priyal Gor as Priyanka 
Rakshanda Khan as Parminder
 Imran Khan as Surinder Sharma
Kanika Verma as Roshni Sharma
Krish Parekh as Bachchitter
 Upasana Shukla as Sheetal
 Alka Ashlesha as Kalavati
 Nishant Tanwar as Shoki

References

External links
 Official website

Sony SAB original programming
Indian comedy television series
Indian drama television series
2011 Indian television series debuts
2011 Indian television series endings
Television shows set in Punjab, India